European Energy Exchange (EEX) AG is a central European electric power and related commodities exchange located in Leipzig, Germany. It develops, operates and connects secure, liquid and transparent markets for energy and related products, including power derivative contracts, emission allowances, agricultural and freight products.

History
The EEX emerged as a result of a merger between LPX Leipzig Power Exchange and the Frankfurt-based EEX in 2002. Deutsche Börse Group's derivatives business unit Eurex acquired the majority share in the EEX in March 2011.

Ownership and subsidiaries
EEX AG is majority owned by Deutsche Börse. It holds shares in the following companies:
 EEX Asia, Cleartech (Cleartrade Exchange Pte Ltd.) (100%)
 EEX CEGH Gas Exchange Services GmbH (51%)
 EEX Link GmbH (100%)
 enermarket GmbH (40%)
 EPEX SPOT SE (51%)
 European Commodity Clearing AG (100%)
 Grexel Systems ltd (100%)
 KB Tech Ltd. (100%)
 Nodal Exchange Holdings, LLC (100%)
 Power Exchange Central Europe a.s. (66,67%)
 Spark Pte. Ltd. (25%)

EEX announced in 2017 that it reached an agreement to acquire US-based Nodal Exchange.

Trading volume
In 2020, the trading of electricity on the EEX Power Derivatives Market amounted to 6,456 TWh (terawatt hours) compared with 5,830 in 2019. In the year 2020, a total of 622 TWh was traded on the Power Spot Markets of EPEX SPOT (2019: 598 TWh). In the field of natural gas, the volume traded on the EEX amounted to 2,412 TWh, a slight decline of minus 5 percent compared with the previous year (2019: 2,546 TWh). The volume of trading in emission allowances amounted to 1,318 million tonnes in 2020 in total (previous year: 1,139 million tonnes).

Spot market
The spot market for electricity is operated by EPEX SPOT, a joint venture owned by German EEX AG and the French Powernext SAS (its 100% daughter). On each day of the year, EPEX SPOT operates day-ahead auctions for three market areas: Germany/Austria, France, and Switzerland. The physical delivery of power takes place the next day. EPEX SPOT also provides an intraday market for Germany, France, Belgium, the Netherlands, Luxembourg, Switzerland, Austria, and the United Kingdom. This market can be used to satisfy short-term needs of electricity or to sell short-term over capacities. Participants in the market can buy up to 45 minutes before every hour of electricity for the specific hour. This market operates 24/7 without exceptions. The electricity for the next day can be traded from 15:00 onwards.

In 2011, EEX introduced 24/7 trading on the Natural Gas Spot Market. On the Spot Market, companies can trade natural gas on a continuous basis for the current day (within-day), one day, and two days in advance as well as for the following weekend. Since the launch of 24/7 trading, EEX has also offered continuous trading with a minimum lot size of 1 MW (in addition to the 10 MW contracts). Short term gas quantities can be traded on the exchange for delivery in the market areas GASPOOL, NetConnect Germany (NCG), and the Dutch Title Transfer Facility (TTF) area.

EEX offers also a spot market for EU allowances. Since 2005, EEX operates both spot and derivatives markets in emission allowances. EEX has offered trading of emission allowances on the basis of the EU Emissions Trading Scheme (EU ETS) since 2005. EEX currently runs a secondary market for continuous trading on a Spot and Derivatives basis for EU ETS allowances (EUA, EUAA) and Kyoto credits (CER, ERU). As of 26 March 2008, it is possible to trade CER Futures on the EEX (Certified Emission Reductions), global emission credits in accordance with the Kyoto Protocol. On 14 April 2008 EEX and Eurex launched trading of options on EUA Futures. Since January 2010 EEX AG runs the auctioning of the Emission Allowances issued by the Federal Ministry of the Environment. All trading participants admitted to trading in emission allowances on EEX are able to take part in the auction without any further preconditions regarding licensing. From the very beginning, this also included all trading participants taking part in the existing Eurex cooperation on the Derivatives Market. In addition, EEX also carries out the EUA auctions for further countries (Poland, Hungary). The European Energy Exchange (EEX) has won the tendering procedure for the transitory auctioning platform for the EUA auctioned off by Germany for the third emissions trading period in February 2012 and it was chosen as a cooperation exchange for the NER30 program of the European Investment Bank (EIB). As of 30 April 2012, emission allowances for the aviation industry (EU Aviation Allowances – EUAA) will also be offered for trading. Furthermore, Futures on Emission Reduction Units (ERU) will be launched at the end of April. In March, EEX extended the futures on Certified Emission Reductions (CER) for all maturities of the third trading period.

Derivatives market
Participants on the EEX can trade power contracts (weeks, months, quarters, years) up to 6 years in the future. The Power Futures are financially settled contracts, but they can be physically delivered in Germany, France, Austria, Belgium, the Netherlands and Italy (Coming). Besides electricity also natural gas futures (market areas GASPOOL and NCG), a broad range of  derivatives (Futures on EUA, CER, EUAA and ERU) can be traded at the EEX-Derivatives market.

Clearing and settlement
Clearing and settlement of all exchange transactions are done by the European Commodity Clearing AG (ECC). ECC was founded in 2006 with the transfer of the EEX clearing activities to this subsidiary. Specialised in the physical delivery of energy products, ECC is dedicated clearing provider for 10 exchanges: European Energy Exchange (EEX), EEX Asia, EPEX SPOT, Powernext, and Power Exchange Central Europe (PXE)as well as the partner exchanges HUPX, HUDEX, NOREXECO, SEEPEX, and SEMOpx. Furthermore, EEX and ECC provide the service of Trade Registration. This service enables the trading participants and the trade registration participants to conclude transactions through registration by mutual agreement or to have over-the-counter transactions registered.

Transparency
EEX operates "Transparency in Energy Markets", the neutral platform for energy market data which fulfils the statutory publication requirements and implements the market participants' voluntary commitments. The platform was established by EEX and the four German transmission system operators and launched in October 2009. In 2011, the Austrian transmission system operator Austrian Power Grid AG joined the cooperation. EEX is in charge of the operation of the platform, which comprises plausibility checking, anonymisation, aggregation and publication of the data reported.

On 2 September 2014, the European Energy Exchange (EEX) launched its new transparency site. At www.eex-transparency.com, visitors can gain access to comprehensive fundamental data and relevant information for wholesale energy trading. The website is a further development of the existing platform "Transparency in Energy Market" and contains information about capacity, utilization and availability of facilities for the production of electricity as well as new information on the storage of electricity and natural gas consumption.

See also
Nord Pool AS

References

External links 
 Website of EEX
 Annual Report of EEX
 Transparency Platform of EEX
 Website of ECC

External links
EEX website
"Transparency in Energy Markets"

Electric power exchanges in Europe
Companies based in Leipzig
Companies listed on the Frankfurt Stock Exchange
Energy in Germany
Energy in Europe